Tabitha St. Germain, formerly known as Paulina Gillis Germain and also known as Tabitha or Kitanou St. Germain, is a Canadian actress and comedian. She is known for a variety of roles across many different shows. She has been actively doing voice-overs for animated series and films, video games, and commercials since 1985. Her best known roles include Fllay Allster in the English dub of Mobile Suit Gundam SEED, Scary Godmother in the Scary Godmother television film dualogy, the eponymous character in the PBS Kids series Martha Speaks, and the speaking voice of Rarity among other characters in My Little Pony: Friendship is Magic.

Early career 
As Paulina Gillis, she won a Dora Award in 1995 for her performance in Assassins, the Stephen Sondheim musical. She legally changed her name to Tabitha St. Germain in November 1997.

Filmography

Web productions 
 #Tweet It: Featuring My Little Pony Staff and Bronies – Herself (music video)
 BlackGryph0n's 50,000 Subscribers Special – Herself (video)

Live-action films 
 Supernatural (American TV series) - Nikolai's Friend
 Bronies: The Extremely Unexpected Adult Fans of My Little Pony – Rarity (archive sound)

Western animation

as Tabitha St. Germain 
 1001 Nights – Donyazad
 Angry Birds: Summer Madness – Lynette, Brenda
 Ark – Empress Cathebel
 Barbie: Fairytopia – Dandelion, Topaz
 Barbie Fairytopia: Mermaidia – Dandelion, Teeny Mermaid
 Barbie Fairytopia: Magic of the Rainbow – Dandelion, Topaz
 The Barbie Diaries – Other Sales Girl
 Barbie in a Christmas Carol – Spirit of Christmas Past, Seamstress, Baby
 Barbie: Mariposa and her Butterfly Fairy Friends – Willa, Coral, Flutterpixie
 Barbie: Thumbelina – Chrysella
 Barbie and the Three Musketeers – Miette Walla
 Barbie in A Mermaid Tale – Zuma, Deanne
 Barbie in A Mermaid Tale 2 – Zuma
 Barbie: Princess Charm School – Grace, Lorraine
 Barbie: A Fashion Fairytale – Marie-Alecia "Alice"
 Barbie in the Pink Shoes – Madame Natasha / The Snow Queen, Sugar Plum Fairy, Swan Dancer, Stage Manager
 Barbie: Mariposa & the Fairy Princess – Willa, Zee
 Barbie & Her Sisters in A Pony Tale – Max
 Barbie: The Pearl Princess – Purple Mer-teen
 Barbie and the Secret Door – Malucia
 Barbie in Princess Power – Parker
 Being Ian – Sandi Crocker
 Bionicle 2: Legends of Metru Nui – Nokama
 Bionicle 3: Web of Shadows – Nokama
 Braceface – Christy Lee
 Captain Flamingo – Milo Powell/Captain Flamingo
 Care Bears: Adventures in Care-a-Lot – Cheer Bear
 Chuck's Choice – Misha's Mom
 Class of the Titans – Persephone, Aphrodite, Psyche
 The Cramp Twins – Mari Phelps
 Dinosaur Train – Shirley Stygimoloch, Spiky Stygimoloch, Keenan Chirostenotes, Mrs. Conductor the Troodon, Patricia Palaeobatrachus, Minnie Microraptor, Mikey Microraptor, Angela Avisaurus, Mrs. Deinonychus, Arlene Archaeopteryx, Cindy Cimolestes, Sonja Styracosaurus, and Stephie Styracosaurus
 D'Myna Leagues – Nikki Tinker
 Doggie Daycare – Cookie
 Dragon Booster – Spratt
 Dreamkix – Emily
 Ed, Edd n Eddy – Nazz (1999)
 Generation O! – Eddie
 George of the Jungle – Magnolia, Tooky Tooky
 Help! I'm a Fish – Eel
 Hero: 108 – Alpha Girl Latifah, Archer Lee, Rattle Diva, Peacock Queen
 Holly and Hal Moose: Our Uplifting Christmas Adventure – Worker Elf
 Iron Man: Armored Adventures – Maria Hill
 Jimmy Two-Shoes – Heloise
 Johnny Test (2021 TV series) – Ms. Shush, Gabbler, Old Lady
 Kate and Mim-Mim – Lilly
 Kid vs. Kat – Phoebe, Mrs. Brenigan
 Krypto the Superdog – Andrea Sussman, Melanie Whitney
 League of Super Evil – Cougar, Elizabeth "Lightning Liz" Sergeant, Goldenrod, Miss B. Mean
 Lego Ninjago: Masters of Spinjitzu – Mistaké (Season 8–9), Akita (Secrets of Forbidden Spinjitzu)
 Littlest Pet Shop – Pepper Mildred Clark, additional voices
 Littlest Pet Shop: A World of Our Own – Flinty Golden, Gigi Monkeyford, Dara Longville, Racehorse, Willow Longstout, Sultanna Siam, Dooley Wolfhound, Loudspeaker, Sasha Siberio, Breezy Laperm, Blutty Cattily, Elly Phanto, Tessa, Aloha Hawaiian Cat
 LoliRock – Auriana, Amaru, Aunt Ellen, Carissa, others
 Make Way For Noddy – Dinah Doll
 Martha Speaks – Martha Lorraine, Mariela Lorraine
 Martin Mystery – Jenni Anderson
 Maya the Bee – Ben, Zoe and Lisby
 Max & Ruby – Martha
 Monster Buster Club – Wendy, John
 ¡Mucha Lucha! – Penny Plutonium
 ¡Mucha Lucha!: The Return of El Maléfico – Bride, Duchess, Tourist Gal, Female Vegas Singer
 My Little Pony (direct-to-video animated specials) – Minty, Thistle Whistle, Wysteria, Fiesta Flair and Scootaloo
 My Little Pony: Friendship Is Magic – Rarity, Princess Luna / Nightmare Moon, Granny Smith, Muffins, Mrs. Cake, Princess Flurry Heart, Photo Finish, additional voices
 My Little Pony: Equestria Girls – Rarity, Princess/Vice Principal Luna, Mrs. Cake
 My Little Pony: Equestria Girls – Rainbow Rocks – Rarity, Vice Principal Luna, Photo Finish
 My Little Pony: Equestria Girls – Friendship Games – Rarity, Vice Principal Luna
 My Little Pony: Equestria Girls – Legend of Everfree – Rarity, Vice Principal Luna, Muffins
 My Little Pony: Equestria Girls (2017 television specials) – Rarity, Patron
 My Little Pony: Equestria Girls (2017 animated shorts) – Rarity, Photo Finish, Granny Smith
 My Little Pony: Equestria Girls (web series) – Rarity, Lily Pad, Granny Smith, Sunny Sugarsocks, Photo Finish
 My Little Pony: Pony Life – Rarity, Spike
 My Little Pony: The Movie – Rarity, Princess Luna, Granny Smith, Muffins
 My Little Pony: Best Gift Ever – Rarity, Muffins, Princess Flurry Heart
 My Little Pony: Rainbow Roadtrip – Rarity
 My Little Pony: Equestria Girls – Forgotten Friendship – Rarity, Princess/Vice Principal Luna
 My Little Pony: Equestria Girls – Rollercoaster of Friendship – Rarity, Granny Smith
 My Little Pony: Equestria Girls – Spring Breakdown – Rarity
 My Little Pony: Equestria Girls – Sunset's Backstage Pass – Rarity
 My Little Pony: Equestria Girls – Holidays Unwrapped – Rarity, Vice Principal Luna, Granny Smith, and Photo Finish
 My Little Pony: A New Generation – Rarity
 Nerds and Monsters – Dudley Squat, Becky Hooger, Craboon
 Nina's World – Claire, Mrs. Goldstein, Star, Flamingo, Big Sister Bear, Fair Patron, Squirrel #1
 The Nutty Professor – Robin
 Pac-Man and the Ghostly Adventures – Rotunda, Grannie
 Packages from Planet X – Calimary, Dan's Grandmother, Amanda's Mother
 Pocket Dragon Adventures – Binky
 Polly Pocket – Beth
 Polly Pocket: 2 Cool at the Pocket Plaza – Beth
 Polly Pocket: PollyWorld – Beth
 Popeye's Voyage: The Quest for Pappy – Olive Oyl, Swee'Pea
 Pucca – Pucca, Ring Ring
 Ratchet & Clank – Juanita Alvaro
 Rated A for Awesome – Mr. Twitchy
 Ready Jet Go! – Auntie Eggplant
 RollBots – Tinny
 Sabrina: Secrets of a Teenage Witch – Hilda Spellman, Veralupa
 Scary Godmother: Halloween Spooktakular – Scary Godmother, Ruby
 Scary Godmother: The Revenge of Jimmy – Scary Godmother, Ruby
 Slugterra – Desdemona, Little Boy, Cantina Tough Woman
 Storm Hawks – Dove
 Supernoobs – Shope, Sue Newswoman, Mrs. Craberton
 Team Galaxy – Brett
 Team Zenko Go – Ponzu, Donna, Fawna, Rona
 A Very Fairy Christmas – Shaily
 Voltron Force − Kala
 The Legend of Zelda − Spryte
 Weird-Oh's – Portia
 Yakkity Yak – Penelope
 Zeke's Pad – Ida Palmer, Chester

as Paulina Gillis 
 ALF: The Animated Series and ALF Tales – Augie Shumway, Rhonda
 The Adventures of Super Mario Bros. 3 and Super Mario World – Kootie Pie Koopa
 The Care Bears Family – Swift Heart Rabbit
 C.O.P.S. – Ms. Demeanor
 Dog City – Kitty
 Kleo the Misfit Unicorn – Hilda, Ms. Abigail 
 Little Rosey – Tess
 The Littlest Angel – Littlest Angel
 Star Wars: Ewoks – Asha
 Swamp Thing – Abigail Arcane
 Tales from the Cryptkeeper – Sally, Zola

Anime 
 .hack//Roots – Asta, Nazo Grunty
 Black Lagoon – Roberta
 Death Note – Naomi Misora
 Dragon Drive – Chibisuke
 Earth Girl Arjuna – Sayuri Shirakawa
 Galaxy Angel S – Ranpha Franboise
 Galaxy Angel X – Ranpha Franboise
 Hamtaro – Pashmina
 Infinite Ryvius – Criff Kei
 Let's Go Quintuplets – Krystal
 MegaMan NT Warrior – Maddy
 Mirmo! – Katie Minami
 Mix Master - Pachi
 Gundam SEED – Flay Allster, Birdy (Torii), Haro
 Gundam SEED Destiny – Birdy (Torii), Haro, Abby Windsor, Hilda Harken
 Gundam 00 – Soma Peries, Haro
 Popotan – Konami, Unagi, Magical Girl Lilo
 Powerpuff Girls Z – Miss Keane, Ivy, Violet, Sapphire
 Shakugan no Shana (Season 1) – Shana
 Sword of the Stranger – Mu-Mao
 Transformers: Armada – Alexis
 Transformers: Energon – Alexis
 Transformers: Cybertron – Professor Lucy Suzuki
 Zoids Fuzors – Sandra, Ciao, Female TV Announcer

Live-action television 
 And Then There Was One – ICU nurse (as Paulina Gillis)
 The New Addams Family – Melancholia, Catastrophia

Video game roles 
 Devil Kings – Bramble
 Dynasty Warriors Gundam 2 – Haro, Tutorial Operator
 Dragalia Lost – Estelle, Mym (Halloween), Althemia, Myriam
 Mobile Suit Gundam: Encounters in Space – Soldiers, Pilots
 My Little Pony: Friendship Is Magic – Rarity, Princess Luna / Nightmare Moon, Mrs. Cake
 Under the Skin – Cosmi, Annie Campbell, Princess Cleo

References

External links 
 
 
 

Living people
Actresses from Boston
Actresses from Vancouver
American emigrants to Canada
Canadian film actresses
Canadian musical theatre actresses
Canadian television actresses
Canadian video game actresses
Canadian voice actresses
Canadian women comedians
Comedians from Vancouver
Year of birth missing (living people)
20th-century Canadian actresses
21st-century Canadian actresses
20th-century Canadian comedians
21st-century Canadian comedians